Porina chlorotica is a species of lichen belonging to the family Porinaceae.

Synonym:
 Verrucaria chlorotica Ach., 1810 (= basionym)

References

Lichen species
Gyalectales